Riders of the Storm is a 1929 American silent Western film directed by J.P. McGowan and starring Yakima Canutt, Bobby Dunn and Ione Reed.

Cast
 Yakima Canutt
 Bobby Dunn
 Ione Reed
 Dorothy Vernon
 Slim Whitaker

References

Bibliography
 McGowan, John J. J.P. McGowan: Biography of a Hollywood Pioneer. McFarland, 2005.

External links
 

1929 films
1929 Western (genre) films
American black-and-white films
Films directed by J. P. McGowan
Silent American Western (genre) films
1920s English-language films
1920s American films